The 41st Iowa Infantry Battalion was an infantry battalion that served in the Union Army during the American Civil War.

Service
The 41st Iowa Infantry was organized as Companies A, B, and C of the 14th Iowa Volunteer Infantry Regiment at Davenport, Iowa and mustered in for three years of Federal service on November 6, 1861.  These three companies were immediately detached and sent to Fort Randall, Dakota Territory, arriving there on December 5, 1861.  The companies were permanently detached from the 14th Iowa on September 18, 1862, where they remained until May 1863.  At one time, the state of Iowa intended to use these companies as the nucleus of a 41st Iowa Regiment, but this plan was abandoned.

The battalion was transferred to the 7th Iowa Volunteer Cavalry Regiment in April 1863.

Total strength and casualties
A total of 293 men served in the 41st Iowa Battalion at one time or another during its existence.
It suffered 2 enlisted men who died of disease, for a total of 2 fatalities.

Commanders
 Major John Pattee

See also
List of Iowa Civil War Units
Iowa in the American Civil War

Notes

References
The Civil War Archive

Units and formations of the Union Army from Iowa
Military units and formations established in 1861
1861 establishments in Iowa
Military units and formations disestablished in 1863